Governor Hendricks may refer to:

Thomas A. Hendricks (1819–1885), 6th Governor of Indiana
William Hendricks (1782–1850), 3rd Governor of Indiana